Targa Newfoundland is a tarmac-based rally race in Newfoundland. It is an annual event covering  over a seven-day period in September of each year on eastern and central parts of Newfoundland.

The event allows the owners of historic, classic and modern sporting motor vehicles to drive them the way they were designed to be driven in a rally competition. In the event each vehicle competes against itself on a handicap basis as well as against other vehicles. 

Several events are run over the same stages, which remain closed to other traffic during this time:

 Fast Tour, a non competitive event which allows the owners of exotic cars to drive them the way they were meant to be driven, without the stress of competition;
 Grand Touring, a time-speed-distance rally (TSD Rally) emphasizing precision in maintaining the average speed set by the organizers;
 Targa, where the objective is to meet or slightly better the stage times set by the organizers for the age, displacement and modification level of the vehicle. Every competitor who completes all stages within the established trophy times wins a Targa plate.

There are also trophies for overall placing in the Touring and Targa events, and for placing within the various categories within the Targa event, as well as trophies for national and marque teams, and for the best-placed novice team.

The Targa Newfoundland is made possible though the efforts of 2,200+ volunteers and members of 70+ Newfoundland communities.

Event format

The competitive portion of Targa Newfoundland begins and ends in the city of St. John's.  The format for the 15th annual event in 2016 was:

 Prologue (September  11) – Flatrock and Bauline
 Leg 1 (September  12) – Avalon Peninsula
 Leg 2 (September  13) – North Burin Peninsula
 Leg 3 (September  14) – South Bonavista Peninsula
 Leg 4 (September  15) – North Bonavista Peninsula 
 Leg 5 (September  16) – Avalon Peninsula

List of past winners – Targa Division

List of past winners – Grand Touring Division

References

External links
 Targa Newfoundland

Road rallying
Sport in Newfoundland and Labrador
Recurring sporting events established in 2002
2002 establishments in Newfoundland and Labrador